BioServe Space Technologies is a research institute within the University of Colorado in Boulder, Colorado. Since its foundation in 1987 it focuses on developing microgravity life science research and hardware.
Its current center director is Prof. Louis Stodieck

BioServe has designed, built and flown over 50 different payloads on over 40 space flight missions including the Space Shuttle, ISS, MIR, Soyuz, and Progress and recently the SpaceX's Dragon capsule and  Orbital's Cygnus spacecraft.
In 2011 BioServe was selected to be the official payload developer for the YouTube Space Lab - a contest where students were able to propose micro gravitational research and BioServe would develop the winner's experiment hardware and perform all of the mission integration and operations work.
BioServe Space Technologies was also the designer of the Commercial Generic Bioprocessing Apparatus (CGBA) which is a temperature controlled incubator for experiments on cells, microbes, and plants currently in use on the ISS.

References

External links 
 Official Website
 YouTube Channel

Research institutes established in 1987
Research institutes in Colorado
University of Colorado
Space technology research institutes